Driver (known as Driver: You Are the Wheelman in North America) is an action driving video game and the first installment in the Driver series. Developed by Reflections Interactive and published by GT Interactive, it was released on the PlayStation on 25 June 1999. The game, inspired by movie car chases, sees players driving around four real-life cities – Miami, San Francisco, Los Angeles and New York – using a variety of vehicles, with the plot focusing on the work of an undercover police officer, John Tanner, who infiltrates a criminal outfit to investigate their operations, only to discover a plot by their boss to assassinate the President of the United States.

The game proved a commercial hit upon release, and received favorable reviews from critics. Additional versions were created and released at later dates – two ports for Microsoft Windows and Mac were released on 11 October 1999 and in December 2000 respectively; and handheld remakes for the Game Boy Color, developed Crawfish Interactive and published by Infogrames, and for iOS and Palm Pre, developed and published by Gameloft, were released in May 2000 and on 8 December 2009 respectively. The game was re-released on the PlayStation Network on 14 October 2008. The game's success led to further sequels, including Driver 2 in November 2000 and Driver 3 in June 2004.

Gameplay 

The game is played out in four cities: Miami, San Francisco, Los Angeles and New York, each of which remain only partially faithful to the actual city layouts. A fifth bonus city, Newcastle (where Reflections Interactive is based), is unlockable in the PC version through gameplay and in the PlayStation version using a cheat device, but no missions are available and the playable area is small. The game was notable at the time of its original release insofar as the player was able to explore each city as an open world environment. Driver has often been compared to the Grand Theft Auto series. It also bears significant thematic resemblances to the 20th Century Fox movie The Driver (1978).

Plot 
NYPD detective and former racing driver John Tanner is sent undercover by Lieutenant McKenzie to investigate a crime syndicate led by Castaldi; McKenzie instructs Tanner to go to Miami and meet a pimp named Rufus. After arriving in Miami, Tanner uses his driving skills to prove himself to some gangsters in a parking garage, and becomes their getaway driver.

Tanner carries out jobs for various criminals before meeting Rufus, who tasks Tanner with rescuing Jean-Paul, one of his associates. Rufus is later shot by his girlfriend Jesse, who is apprehended by Tanner, and she reveals that Jean-Paul is now in San Francisco.

Tanner goes to San Francisco, where he finally meets Castaldi and begins working directly for him. He also meets Rusty Slater, his former racing rival, who also works for Castaldi. Tanner later learns that Castaldi is working with a man named Don Hancock, who is running for president. He later suspects that Slater has been spying on him and wrecks Slater's car during a chase, resulting in Slater being arrested.

Castaldi's syndicate move to Los Angeles, where Castaldi plans to assassinate FBI agent Bill Maddox. Tanner instructs Leck, a police associate, to ensure Maddox turns up, otherwise his cover may be blown. The assassination is unsuccessful and the police ambush the gangsters, forcing Tanner to take them to safety. Tanner convinces the suspicious gangsters that Slater told the police about the planned assassination. Leck later tells Tanner that McKenzie recently met with Marcus Vaughn, a corrupt FBI agent who is working with Castaldi and Hancock.

The syndicate then moves to New York, where Castaldi plans a high profile assassination. Tanner is told by his police associates that McKenzie wants him to pull out of the undercover operation, as he worries for Tanner's cover, and Leck tells Tanner that Hancock has bribed several people in the FBI. Tanner remains undercover and continues working for Castaldi, intent on uncovering his plan.

Tanner eventually learns that Castaldi plans to assassinate the President of the United States, and Tanner is tasked with driving the President's car. However, he ignores all instructions and takes the President to safety. McKenzie then arrives and tells Tanner that Castaldi and all of his associates, including Hancock and Vaughn, have been arrested. However, Tanner suspects that the police and FBI were involved with Castaldi, and he leaves, ignoring McKenzie completely.

Development 
Series creator Martin Edmonson was inspired by the very first film he saw at the cinema, 1978 crime thriller The Driver. The "infamous car park level", which tasked players with performing a series of driving feats such as handbrake turns and slaloming and caused many players difficulties, was directly lifted from a scene in the film. 

The destruction of vehicles in-game was inspired by Edmonson watching "real destruction derbies and banger racing" as a child and observing the "twisted metal and the battered cars" afterwards. To achieve the "sound effects of the crunching metal sound" of car crashes during development the team "went to a wrecker’s yard and hired a big JCB, and we were picking up cars and dropping them on top of other cars".

In 2009, a remastered version of the game was released on the App Store. Developed and published by Gameloft, the original plot and structure were left intact, but the graphics were enhanced, the music was re-done, and voice acting was re-recorded for the cutscenes.

Reception 

Driver was a commercial hit, with sales above 1 million units by early August 1999. In the German market, Drivers PlayStation version received a "Gold" award from the Verband der Unterhaltungssoftware Deutschland (VUD) by the end of July, indicating sales of at least 100,000 units across Germany, Austria and Switzerland. The committee raised it to "Platinum" status (200,000 sales) by the end of September. In the United States, Drivers jewel case version for computers sold 390,000 copies and earned $3.8 million by August 2006, after its release in October 2000. It was the country's 42nd-best-selling computer game between January 2000 and August 2006. , it has sold over  units worldwide and grossed $150 million in revenue.

Upon its initial release, Driver was met with very positive feedback and critical acclaim. The PlayStation and iOS versions received "favorable" reviews according to video game review aggregator Metacritic.

Jeff Lundrigan reviewed the PlayStation version of the game for Next Generation, rating it four stars out of five, and stated that "a movie buff's dream – but Driver is still great even if you aren't big on movies".

IGN's Douglass C. Perry said of the original PlayStation game: "In the history of driving games for PlayStation, there is nothing that comes close to the comprehensive, deep, and thoroughly pleasurable experience that's embedded deep in the heart of Driver [...] It fulfills driving enthusiasts' deepest desires to drive as fast as possible through major US cities and to slam into just about anything without any repercussions. In that sense, Driver is a dream come true". He went on to call it "one of the best driving games on any system". Game Revolution's Ben Silverman was equally impressed, saying: "Driver excels where other games have failed by striking a perfect balance between action and realism. Car handling is a wonderful mixture of true physics and arcade functionality—not as nitpicky and sim oriented as Gran Turismo nor as ridiculously implausible as SF Rush. Driving follows the 'easy to learn, hard to master' formula [...] Rarely does a game captivate the stoic and hypercritical Game Revolution office, but Driver has done just that". GameSpot's Ryan MacDonald was not as enthusiastic, saying: "Driver is a game that might be mediocre in its presentation but more than makes up for it in its gameplay and concept".

IGN's Mike Morrissey praised the quality of the PC port and said: "Though the PC version of Driver is a fairly straight port from the PlayStation title released in July, graphic improvements are apparent, especially at resolutions of 800x600 and over with the details cranked. Though this requires a fairly fast computer, the effect is worth it. Smooth frame rates reveal nice textures for the buildings and surroundings, translucent water in areas of Miami, and of course, lens flare". GameSpot's Erik Wolpaw was somewhat disappointed with the port, but this was negated because the original game was so strong: "Like many console-to-PC ports, Driver suffers from being translated verbatim and taking little advantage of the more powerful PC platform. However, Drivers core game design is so strikingly original and fun that it can be enjoyed without embellishment". They concluded that "it is addictive, intuitive, and fun, which are qualities sometimes overlooked in the industry's myopic pursuit of purely technical innovation. With Driver, Reflections has produced the definitive re-creation of the classic urban car-chase movie and has quite possibly introduced a new genre of driving game".

IGN's Craig Harris praised the Game Boy Color port's top down view and the controls and concluded: "I'm actually quite surprised at how well Driver turned out for the Game Boy Color. I was expecting a Point-A-to-B game like Grand Theft Auto and got a whole lot more. The missions have different elements to give the basic formula a bit more variety. It's missing a few details from the PlayStation version, but for what Crawfish had to work with hardware-wise, the development team did a great job". GameSpot's Frank Provo was critical of the sound, but aside from that, he said, "Driver is smoothness personified. Driving around is fun and exciting, the levels are varied, and the side games really do improve your skill within the main game. Even without a battery save and a two-player feature, there's really nothing major to complain about".

Despite the general praise, the opening tutorial set in a car park, where the player has to perform various stunts and moves (such as drifting and 180 degree turns) as well as the final mission, were criticised for excessive difficulty. Because of this, the game frequently appears in lists of 'hardest PS1 games'.

At the 1999 E3 Game Critics Awards, Driver won "Best Racing Game", and in 2002 it was ranked No. 12 on IGN's list of the "Top 25 PlayStation Games".

References

External links 
 Archived official website

1999 video games
 01
Game Boy Color games
Ubisoft games
GT Interactive games
Infogrames games
IOS games
Classic Mac OS games
Open-world video games
Organized crime video games
PlayStation (console) games
Video games about police officers
Video games developed in the United Kingdom
Video games scored by Allister Brimble
Video games set in Los Angeles
Video games set in Miami
Video games set in New York City
Video games set in San Francisco
Windows games
BAFTA winners (video games)
Crawfish Interactive games
Single-player video games
MacSoft games